David Houston Coleman (8 April 1967 – May 1997) was an English footballer who played in the Football League as a defender for AFC Bournemouth and appeared on loan for Colchester United.

Career
Coleman was born in Salisbury, and began his career with AFC Bournemouth after coming through the youth ranks with the club. He made 50 appearances for the Cherries and scored two goals. He joined Colchester United on a month-long loan deal in February 1988, making his debut in a 1–0 home defeat to Burnley on 19 February. He made six appearances for the U's, scoring once in a 2–1 home defeat to Wrexham on 4 March.

Coleman left Bournemouth in 1991 and played for a host of non-league clubs including Poole, Farnborough, Dorchester, Salisbury, Wimborne, Amesbury and Warminster.

Coleman died in May 1997.

References

1967 births
1997 deaths
Sportspeople from Salisbury
English footballers
Association football defenders
AFC Bournemouth players
Colchester United F.C. players
Poole Town F.C. players
Farnborough F.C. players
Dorchester Town F.C. players
Salisbury City F.C. players
Wimborne Town F.C. players
Amesbury Town F.C. players
Warminster Town F.C. players
English Football League players